The 1961 Tour of Flanders cycling race took place on March 26, 1961, and was won by Rapha-Gitane-Dunlop's Tom Simpson, becoming the first British winner. It was the 45th edition of the Tour of Flanders "monument" classic race.

Route
The race started in Ghent and finished in Wetteren for the last time – after 17 years. The total distance was 255 km. There were six categorized climbs:

Results

References

External links
 

Tour of Flanders
Tour of Flanders, 1961
Tour of Flanders
1961 Super Prestige Pernod
Tour of Flanders